The Los Angeles Emmy Awards are presented by the Academy of Television Arts & Sciences (ATAS) in recognition of excellence in the local programming of the Greater Los Angeles area. They are the only regional Emmys presented directly by the ATAS; all the other regional Emmys across the country are given out by each regional chapter of the ATAS' sister organization, the National Academy of Television Arts and Sciences (NATAS).

The Los Angeles Emmy Award is the successor to the first three Emmy Award ceremonies held from 1949 to 1951 when the Emmy primarily only honored shows that were produced or aired in the Los Angeles area.

The ATAS also gives out the Los Angeles Area Governors Award, which is presented for outstanding consistent achievement over a period of years, or in recognition of an outstanding, single notable contribution.

Board of governors 

The Los Angeles academy is composed of individuals who hold prominent positions in and about the entertainment field. Their job is to help oversee the business and artistic affairs of the academy as well as the awards broadcast. They serve as an active board within the academy.

Board members 

Board members are elected and unlike the Board of Governors, their function is to attend business meetings and handle the everyday administration of the academy.

References

Regional Emmy Awards
Awards established in 1949
1949 establishments in California